Bethany Memorial Airport  is a public use airport in Harrison County, Missouri. It is owned by the city of Bethany and located two nautical miles (4 km) northeast of its central business district.

Facilities and aircraft 
Bethany Memorial Airport covers an area of 25 acres (10 ha) at an elevation of 1,035 feet (315 m) above mean sea level. It has one runway designated 3/21 with an asphalt surface measuring 2,255 by 48 feet (687 x 15 m). For the 12-month period ending June 30, 2011, the airport had 82 general aviation aircraft operations.

See also 
 List of airports in Missouri

References

External links 
 Airport page at City of Bethany website
  at Missouri DOT Airport Directory
 Aerial image as of February 1996 from USGS The National Map

Airports in Missouri
Transportation in Harrison County, Missouri
Transportation in Missouri